A Flash Flood of Colour World Tour was a concert tour by rock band Enter Shikari, which took place through 2012 and 2013, in support of the band's third studio album A Flash Flood of Colour, released on 16 January 2012. The tour supersedes the world tour that the band embarked on to support Common Dreads throughout 2009 and 2010. A Flash Flood of Colour was recorded in Bangkok, Thailand, between 8 May and 4 June 2011.

About

The band began the tour with two intimate warm-up shows in London and Amsterdam, on 15 & 17 June, respectively. The official first leg began as part of the Warped Tour 2011 with the band playing on the Advent stage throughout the whole tour, with the European leg beginning on 26 August 2011, as the band plays the main stage as the Leeds and Reading festivals and then heading out on a tour of mainland Europe throughout September and October with support from Your Demise and letlive. These shows were the first to feature tracks from A Flash Flood of Colour live, which were Sssnakepit and Arguing With Thermometers.

On 3 November 2011, the band set out to North America and Canada to support The Devil Wears Prada, along with Whitechapel and For Today.

The band played 3 intimate shows in the UK to celebrate the release of A Flash Flood of Colour. The first show on the actual release date, 16 January 2012, was at The Borderline in London. The event was sponsored by HMV, and you had to pre-order the new album via their webstore or the Enter Shikari webstore to be entered into a draw to win tickets to attend. Support came from Sam Duckworth (Get Cape. Wear Cape. Fly).
The next show the following day was at The Hippodrome in Kingston, where if you pre-ordered the new album via independent record store Banquet Records, you could attend the show, which sold out extremely quickly. The final show was at The Cockpit in Leeds, where the band again showed their support for independent record stores and solely allowed entrance to those who pre-ordered the new album from Jumbo Records and Crash Records, whom sold out of their allocation within an hour of going on sale. These shows were the first times the tracks, "System...", "...Meltdown," "Stalemate," "Gandhi Mate, Gandhi," "Search Party," and "Hello Tyrannosaurus, Meet Tyrannocide" were ever played live. Support for these two shows came from Fine Young Firecrackers.
The following two days featured signings at HMV in Leicester and St. Albans.

On 12 February 2012, the band played a very lowkey and insanely fast selling show at The Bull and Gate, a small pub in Kentish Town for the purpose to be filmed exclusively for Scuzz. The show aired on 31 March 2012 at 5pm. The show was filmed and edited by Stand Your Ground Media.

On 23 February 2012, the band set out to Australia for Soundwave and a series of sideshows via Tokyo, Japan for one sold-out show.
The band headlined Stage 6A at Soundwave. Support for the sideshows came from letlive. and Your Demise.

On arrival back from Australia, the band and crew tackled jet-lag to instantly begin work on pre-production for the European and UK headline run, starting on 10 March 2012 in Amsterdam, Netherlands, lasting two weeks finishing in a sold out Hammersmith Apollo show in London on 23 March 2012, which was the only show to feature a cameo appearance from "Phillis McCleavland", Rou's character in the video for "Arguing with Thermometers". The production for this tour was the most elaborate to date, which featured a huge lighting rig built around 5 large triangles, as well as lasers, bubble machines and confetti machines. Support came from Young Guns, The James Cleaver Quintet (Europe only), and Tek-One (UK only).

On 1 April 2012, the band embarked on their first American headline tour since October 2010, running through to mid May. Support for the tour came from letlive. and At the Skylines. The band wanted to break the traditional 5 or 6 band bill that seems dominant in America right now, and rather allow their supports a decent time slot and changeover time.

Following the American stint, the bands summer focus was solely European festivals, including festivals such as Radio 1's Big Weekend, Reading and Leeds Festivals, Pukkelpop, FM4 Frequency Festival, Sonisphere in Spain, T in the Park, Rock am Ring and Rock im Park, and many more, ranging from the end of May to the end of August.

Set list

Tour dates

Support acts

 At the Skylines (1 April–12 May 2012)
 Cancer Bats (6–20 Dec; 7–27 January 2013)
 Fine Young Firecrackers (17–18 January 2012)
 Get Cape. Wear Cape. Fly (16 January 2012)
 letlive. (28–29 February 2012; 3 April–12 May 2012 ; 17 October–27 November 2012)
 The James Cleaver Quintet (10–15 March 2012)

 I See Stars (17 October–1 December 2012)
 Man With A Mission (26 September 2012)
 Tek One (17–23 March 2012)
 Tyler Mae (15 June 2011)
 Young Guns (10–23 March 2012)
 Your Demise (28–29 February 2012)

As a supporting act
 Falling in Reverse (17 October–1 December 2012)

Personnel
Roughton "Rou" Reynolds - lead vocals, electronics
Liam "Rory" Clewlow - guitar, backing vocals
Chris Batten - bass, backing vocals
Rob Rolfe - drums, percussion

References

2012 concert tours
2013 concert tours
Enter Shikari concert tours